Thomas Martinot-Lagarde (born 7 February 1988) is a French sprinter who specialises in the 110 metres hurdles. He is the older brother of Pascal Martinot-Lagarde.

In 2013, Martinot-Lagarde reached the final of the men's 110 metres hurdles at the 2013 World Championships in Athletics in Moscow, where he finished seventh.

Competition record

References

External links

FFA profile for Thomas Martinot-Lagarde

1988 births
Living people
Sportspeople from Saint-Maur-des-Fossés
French male hurdlers
Mediterranean Games silver medalists for France
Mediterranean Games medalists in athletics
Athletes (track and field) at the 2013 Mediterranean Games
20th-century French people
21st-century French people